Isla Rasa is an island in the Gulf of California east of the Baja California Peninsula. The island is uninhabited and is part of the Mexicali Municipality. The 0.21 sq./mi island has three small ponds and has small shed located in the center of the island.

Biology
Isla Rasa has three species of reptiles: Phyllodactylus nocticolus (peninsular leaf-toed gecko), Sauromalus hispidus (spiny chuckwalla), and Uta stansburiana (common side-blotched lizard).

Isla Rasa is also the primary nesting site for about 95% of the world's Heermann's gulls and elegant terns.

References

Islands of Mexicali Municipality
Islands of Baja California
Islands of the Gulf of California
Uninhabited islands of Mexico
Ramsar sites in Mexico